Dejan Djermanović (born 17 June 1988) is a Slovenian football forward who plays for Ilirija 1911.

Career
Djermanović played for Slavija Sarajevo in Bosnia and Herzegovina and for Krško and Rudar Velenje in Slovenia, before signing with Bulgarian side Litex Lovech in January 2011. In early 2012, Djermanović returned to Slovenia and signed with Olimpija Ljubljana, where he scored a hat-trick on his debut against Nafta Lendava.

In the 2014–15 season he played the first half of the season on loan at another Slovenian top-flight side, Celje, and in January 2015 Olimpija agreed to loan him to the Serbian SuperLiga side Voždovac.

On 6 July 2016, Zhetysu announced that they had signed Djermanović.

On 2 February 2017, he joined the Polish second division team Miedź Legnica.

Honours
Litex Lovech
 Bulgarian A PFG: 2010–11

References

External links

NZS profile 

1988 births
Living people
Footballers from Ljubljana
Slovenian footballers
Association football forwards
Slovenian expatriate footballers
NK Svoboda Ljubljana players
FK Slavija Sarajevo players
NK Krško players
NK Rudar Velenje players
PFC Litex Lovech players
NK Olimpija Ljubljana (2005) players
NK Celje players
FK Voždovac players
FK Željezničar Sarajevo players
FC Zhetysu players
Miedź Legnica players
Stal Mielec players
Paide Linnameeskond players
Al-Nasr SC (Salalah) players
FC Koper players
ND Ilirija 1911 players
Premier League of Bosnia and Herzegovina players
Slovenian Second League players
Slovenian PrvaLiga players
First Professional Football League (Bulgaria) players
Serbian SuperLiga players
Kazakhstan Premier League players
I liga players
Meistriliiga players
Slovenian expatriate sportspeople in Bosnia and Herzegovina
Slovenian expatriate sportspeople in Bulgaria
Slovenian expatriate sportspeople in Serbia
Slovenian expatriate sportspeople in Kazakhstan
Slovenian expatriate sportspeople in Poland
Slovenian expatriate sportspeople in Estonia
Slovenian expatriate sportspeople in Oman
Expatriate footballers in Bosnia and Herzegovina
Expatriate footballers in Bulgaria
Expatriate footballers in Serbia
Expatriate footballers in Kazakhstan
Expatriate footballers in Poland
Expatriate footballers in Estonia
Expatriate footballers in Oman